Yellow Submarine may refer to:

The Beatles
"Yellow Submarine" (song), released in 1966
Yellow Submarine (film), a 1968 feature-length animated film featuring The Beatles' music
Yellow Submarine (album), 1969 soundtrack to the film
Yellow Submarine Songtrack, 1999 expanded remix of the Yellow Submarine album
Yellow Submarine (sculpture), large-scale work of art at Liverpool Airport, based on the song and film
Ringo's Yellow Submarine, 1983 radio show hosted by Ringo Starr

Architecture
 Yellow Submarine (club), a nightclub in Munich, established in 1971

Submarines
 Yellow Submarine, nickname for an unmanned acoustic test vehicle, originally the American submarine 
 Yellow Submarine, nickname for Quester I, built in an attempt to salvage the wreck of the SS Andrea Doria

Sports
"The Yellow Submarine", nickname for the Spanish football team Cádiz CF
"The Yellow Submarine", nickname for the Spanish football team Villarreal CF